Robert Frederick Price (August 6, 1890 - July 18, 1956) served in the California State Assembly for the 72nd district from 1943 to 1951 and during World War I he served in the United States Army.

References

United States Army personnel of World War I
20th-century American politicians
Republican Party members of the California State Assembly
1890 births
1956 deaths
People from Stutsman County, North Dakota